Santa Lucia and similar terms may refer to:

Architecture 
 Abbey of Santa Lucia, a medieval abbey in the comune of Rocca di Cambio, Abruzzo, central Italy
 Monastero di Santa Lucia, Adrano, a former Benedictine monastery in Catania, Italy
 Santa Lucia, Parma, a Baroque-style Roman Catholic church located in Parma, region of Emilia Romagna, Italy
 Santa Lucia, Venice, a church in Venice, northern Italy, demolished in 1861
 Santa Lucia in Selci, an ancient Roman Catholic church in Rome, Italy
 Venezia Santa Lucia railway station, the central station of Venice, Italy

Music and film 
 "Santa Lucia" (song), a traditional Neapolitan song
 "Santa Lucia Luntana", a Neapolitan song
 "Santa Lucia", a song written by Roque Narvaja, and popularized by Miguel Ríos
 "St. Lucia", a song by the rapper Future on his 2019 EP Save Me
 St. Lucia (musician), a South African singer and musician
 Santa Lucia (film), a 1956 West German musical comedy film

Places

Argentina
Santa Lucía, Corrientes
Santa Lucía Department
Santa Lucía River (Argentina)

Australia
 St Lucia, Queensland, a riverside suburb in the City of Brisbane, Queensland, Australia

Brazil
 Santa Lúcia, Paraná

Chile
 Santa Lucía Hill, Santiago
 Santa Lucía metro station (Santiago)

Colombia
 Santa Lucía, Atlántico
 Santa Lucía (TransMilenio), a BRT station in Bogotá
 Santa Lucía station (Medellín), a metro station

Cuba
 Santa Lucía (Minas de Matahambre)

Ecuador
 Santa Lucía Canton

France 
 Santa-Lucia-di-Mercurio, a commune in the Haute-Corse department of France on the island of Corsica
 Santa-Lucia-di-Moriani, a commune in the Haute-Corse department of France on the island of Corsica

Guatemala
 Santa Lucía Cotzumalguapa
 Santa Lucía Milpas Altas
 Santa Lucía La Reforma
 Santa Lucía Utatlán

Honduras
 Santa Lucía, Francisco Morazán
 Santa Lucía, Intibucá

Italy

 Santa Lucia (Siniscola), part of the municipality of Siniscola in Sardinia (Italy)
 Santa Lucia or Borgo Santa Lucia, historic waterfront district of Naples
 Santa Lucia, Città di Castello, a frazione of the comune of Città di Castello in the Province of Perugia, Umbria, central Italy
 Santa Lucia (Verona), an ancient paesino next to Verona
 Santa Lucia del Mela, a municipality in the Metropolitan City of Messina in the Italian region Sicily
 Santa Lucia di Piave, a comune in the province of Treviso, Veneto, north-eastern Italy
 Santa Lucia di Serino, a town and comune in the province of Avellino, Campania, southern Italy.

Malta
 Santa Luċija, a village

Mexico
 Santa Lucía, Zumpango
 Santa Lucía Airport
 Santa Lucia (Monterrey), an early Spanish settlement in Monterrey
 Santa Lucía, a Metrorrey Line 3 station
 Santa Lucía riverwalk, an artificial river in Monterrey
 Santa Lucía del Camino, Oaxaca
 Santa Lucía Miahuatlán, Oaxaca
 Santa Lucía Monteverde, Oaxaca
 Santa Lucía Ocotlán, Oaxaca

Nicaragua
 Santa Lucía, Boaco

Panama
Santa Lucía, Chiriquí

Philippines
 Santa Lucia, Ilocos Sur
 Santa Lucia Protected Landscape, a protected area in Ilocos Sur

Spain
 Santa Lucía de Tirajana, Canary Islands

Saint Lucia
 Saint Lucia, an island country in the Caribbean

South Africa
 St Lucia, KwaZulu-Natal, a settlement in Umkhanyakude District Municipality in the KwaZulu-Natal province of South Africa
 Lake St. Lucia, in KwaZulu-Natal

United States
 Santa Lucia, Arizona
 Santa Lucia Range, mountains in central California
 Santa Lucia Highlands AVA, California wine region in Monterey County, California
 Santa Lucia Preserve, a private conservation community
 St. Lucia County, Florida, a former Florida county from 1844 to 1855

Uruguay
 Santa Lucía, Uruguay, a city in Canelones Department
 Santa Lucía River
 Santa Lucía del Este, a seaside resort in Canelones Department

Venezuela
 Santa Lucía, Miranda

Organisms 
 Saint Lucia amazon, a species of parrot of the island nation of Saint Lucia
 Saint Lucia lancehead, a species of venomous snake of the island nation of Saint Lucia
 Saint Lucia oriole, a species of bird of the island nation of Saint Lucia
 Santa Lucia lupine, a plant native to California

Others 
 Saint Lucia Labour Party, a social democratic political party in the island nation of Saint Lucia
 Sta. Lucia Realtors, a basketball team in the Philippines
 Sta. Lucia East Grand Mall, a shopping mall in Cainta, Rizal, Philippines
 Battle of Santa Lucia, a battle of the First Italian War of Independence in 1848
 Saint Lucy, 3rd-century Christian saint also known as Santa Lucia

See also 
 Lucia (disambiguation)
 Lucian (disambiguation)
 Saint Lucian (disambiguation)
 Saint Lucie (disambiguation)
 Saint Lucy (disambiguation)
 Santa Luzia (disambiguation)
 St. Lucie (disambiguation)